The 2016 Canadian Mixed Curling Championship was held from November 7 to 14, 2015 at the Weston Golf & Country Club in Toronto, Ontario. The winning Alberta team represented Canada at the 2016 World Mixed Curling Championship.

Alberta won its 11th Canadian Mixed Championship.

Teams
The teams are listed as follows:

Round robin

Standings
Final Round Robin Standings

Results
All draw times listed are in Eastern Standard Time (UTC−5).

Draw 1
Sunday, November 8, 7:00 pm

Draw 2
Monday, November 9, 2:30 pm

Draw 3
Monday, November 9, 7:00 pm

Draw 4
Tuesday, November 10, 10:00 am

Draw 5
Tuesday, November 10, 2:30 pm

Draw 6
Tuesday, November 10, 7:00 pm

Draw 7
Wednesday, November 11, 10:00 am

Draw 8
Wednesday, November 11, 2:30 pm

Draw 9
Wednesday, November 11, 7:00 pm

Placement Round

Standings
Final Round Robin Standings

Results

Draw 1
Thursday, November 12, 10:00 am

Draw 2
Thursday, November 12, 2:30 pm

Draw 3
Thursday, November 12, 7:00 pm

Draw 4
Friday, November 13, 10:00 am

Draw 5
Friday, November 13, 2:30 pm

Draw 6
Friday, November 13, 7:00 pm

Playoffs

Semifinals
Saturday, November 14, 10:00 am

Bronze medal game
Saturday, November 14, 4:00 pm

Final
Saturday, November 14, 4:00 pm

References

External links

2015 in Canadian curling
Canadian Mixed Curling Championship
Curling in Toronto
Canadian Mixed Curling Championship
November 2015 sports events in Canada